A Man Called Gannon is a 1968 American Technicolor Western film directed by James Goldstone starring Tony Franciosa, Michael Sarrazin and Judi West.  The film is a remake of Man Without a Star (1955).

Plot
Cowboy Gannon (Tony Franciosa) rescues Jess Washburn (Michael Sarrazin) from being run over by a train. Together, they got jobs at the ranch working for Beth (Judi West), who has inherited her late husband's spread. Beth is determined to bring in a massive herd of cattle in one season, sell them and move to the city, but neighboring ranchers are worried her plans will destroy their grazing pasture. Beth seduces Jess into fighting the others, and Gannon helps the neighboring ranchers put up barbed wire.

Cast
 Tony Franciosa as Gannon
 Michael Sarrazin as Jess Washburn
 Judi West as Beth
 Susan Oliver as Matty
 John Anderson as Capper
 David Sheiner as Sheriff Polaski
 James Westerfield as Amos
 Gavin MacLeod as Lou
 Eddie Firestone as Maz
 Ed Peck as Delivery Rider
 Harry Davis as Harry
 Robert Sorrells as Goff
 Terry Wilson as Coss
 Eddra Gale as Louisa
 Harry Basch as Ben
 James Callahan as Bo
 Cliff Potter as Ike
 Jason Evers as Mills

Production

The railroad scenes were filmed on the Sierra Railroad in Tuolumne County, California.

See also
Man Without a Star (1955)
List of American films of 1968

References

External links

 

1968 films
1968 Western (genre) films
American Western (genre) films
1960s English-language films
Films scored by Dave Grusin
Films based on American novels
Films based on Western (genre) novels
Films directed by James Goldstone
Universal Pictures films
Remakes of American films
1968 directorial debut films
1960s American films